Somers Limited is an investment holding company based in Hamilton, Bermuda. Its shares are traded on the Bermuda Stock Exchange.

Somers Limited is a financial services investment platform, and the company targets investments primarily in the banking, wealth management and asset financing sectors. Somers Limited has contracted with an external investment manager to manage its investments.

Somers' investments are predominantly in Australia, Bermuda, and the UK. Somers' gross assets at December 31, 2021 was US$694.5 million.

Portfolio Summary

As at December 31, 2021 Somers Limited (Somers) has a relatively concentrated portfolio with investments which are primarily focused on the financial services sector. Geographically, the three key jurisdictions of Australia, Bermuda and the United Kingdom covers 95.7% of total investments. The Somers' portfolio consists of the following:

Resimac Group Limited has a managed mortgage loan portfolio of approximately A$16 billion. Its primary activities are as mortgage manager, mortgage broker and in addition, originating, servicing and securitising mortgage assets. Its shares are listed on the Australian Securities Exchange, and Somers owns 62.3% of Resimac Group Limited, with the balance owned by institutional and retail investors.

Waverton Investment Management Limited is a London-based specialist investment manager with approximately £12.8 billion funds under management and administration, and Somers has a 62.2% holding in this investment.

PCF Group (formerly Private and Commercial Finance Group) is a long established AIM-listed finance group that was awarded a UK Bank Deposit Taking Licence in 2016. PCF Group's bank is PCF Bank. Somers has a 64.4% holding in PCF Group.

West Hamilton Holdings Limited is a Bermuda Stock Exchange listed property investment and management company with property assets in Bermuda and in which Somers has a 57.1% equity interest.

Thorn Group Ltd is an Australian financial services organisation offering consumer and commercial options for leasing products and financing.

Aura Group is a financial services business.

Other Investments: Somers Limited has a number of other smaller investments which are a mixture of both unlisted and listed holdings. As at December 31, 2021 Somers has funds directly and indirectly under management of over US$24.0 billion (2021: US$22.9 million).

History
Somers Limited was founded in 2012 as Bermuda National Limited when Bermuda Commercial Bank Limited, founded in 1969, created a new holding company.

In 2013, Somers made acquisitions including: 
 Private and Commercial Finance Group plc, and 
 Waverton Investment Management, formerly known as J. O. Hambro Investment Management from Credit Suisse Bank

In the 2014 financial year, Somers' key acquisitions included: 
 An investment in Ascot Lloyd Holdings Limited bringing Somers' total potential economic interest to 32.5% 
 An increased shareholding in Westhouse Holdings plc to 84.6% 
 A 6.6% interest in Merrion Capital 
 A 23.8% shareholding in Incol Limited (“Incol”). Incol is a funding platform for financial institutions 
In the 2015 financial year, Somers' key transactions included:
 Sale of holding of shares and convertible loan notes in Private and Commercial Finance Group plc to its wholly owned subsidiary, Bermuda Commercial Bank Limited
 Acquisition of an additional 1,222,949 shares in West Hamilton Holdings Limited from BCB bringing Somers’ total holdings to 57.1%
In the 2016 financial year, Somers' key transactions included:
 Acquisition of a 79% shareholding in RESIMAC Limited (subsequently merged with ASX listed Homeloans Limited resulting in a 59% holding in Homeloans), with a combined loan portfolio at the time of A$13 billion
 In September 2016, Somers acquired a 13% economic interest in MJ Hudson
In the 2017 financial year, Somers' key transactions included:
 RESIMAC Limited merged with Homeloans Limited in October 2016, resulting in a 59% shareholding
 Sale of holding of all shares in Ascot Lloyd Holdings Limited, to CPL Bidco Limited

In the 2018 financial year, Somers' key transactions included:

 Acquisition of 38% of AK Jensen's issued shared capital
Acquisition of 94.5 million shares in PCF Bank from Bermuda Commercial Bank
 Sale of holding of all shares in Merrion Capital Limited, to Cantor Fitzgerald Ireland Limited

In the 2019 financial year, Somers' key transactions included:

 Completion of the sale of holdings in Stockdale Securities and Street Capital Group
In the 2020 financial year, Somers' key transactions included:
 Somers enters an agreement to sell Bermuda Commercial Bank, subject to government and regulatory approvals
Somers received final consideration for the sale of holdings in Stockdale Securities
In the 2021 financial year, Somers' key transactions included:

 Somers acquires 15% stake in Aura Group a Singapore headquartered, fast-growing alternative investment and wealth management platform.
Sale of holding of all shares in Bermuda Commercial Bank to Provident Holdings Ltd 
Investment of A$13.2m in Thorn Group

Board of directors
 Peter Durhager - Chairman of Somers Limited, Chairman of Ascendant Group Ltd and the Bermuda Community Foundation, Non-Executive Director of Harrington Re and F&G Re, and former President of Renaissance Services Ltd
 Alasdair Younie - Director of ICM Limited, and a Non-Executive Director of Allectus Capital Limited and West Hamilton Holdings Limited
Charles Jillings - Chief Executive of ICM Investment Research Limited and ICM Investment Management Limited, and a Director of ICM Limited, Allectus Capital Limited and Waverton Investment Management Limited
David Morgan - Non-Executive Director of Waverton Investment Management Limited, and PCF Group PLC

Sponsorship 
Somers Limited announced in 2014 a four-year corporate sponsorship of the Bermuda Olympic Association, covering the Olympiad including the 2016 Summer Olympics in Rio, Brazil and the 2018 Winter Olympics in Pyeongchang, South Korea.

References

Financial services companies of Bermuda
Financial services companies established in 2012
Hamilton, Bermuda